The Asboe-Hansen sign (also known as "indirect Nikolsky sign'" or "Nikolsky II sign") refers to the extension of a blister to adjacent unblistered skin when pressure is put on the top of the bulla.

This sign is named for the Danish physician Gustav Asboe-Hansen (1917–1989).

It is considered an indirect diagnostic tool in Toxic Epidermal Necrolysis (TEN).

See also 
 Nikolsky's sign
 List of cutaneous conditions

References

Dermatologic signs